Clionella vilma is a species of sea snail, a marine gastropod mollusk in the family Clavatulidae.

Description
The length of the shell attains 28 mm.

The narrow shell has a high spire with evenly convex whorls and a small aperture with a shallow siphonal canal. The shell lacks a subsutural cord or a shoulder sulcus. The axial ribs (numbering 12–22 per whorl) are crossed by fine, close spiral threads. The ground colour of the shell shows various shades of orange

Distribution
This marine species occurs off the Agulhas Bank, South Africa.

References

 Thiele, J. 1925. Wissenschaftliche Ergebnisse der Deutschen Tiefsee-Expedition auf dem Dampfer " Valdivia" 1898–1899. Gastropoda. II Teil. Jena, 17 (2) : 38-382, 
 Kilburn, R.N. (1985). Turridae (Mollusca: Gastropoda) of southern Africa and Mozambique. Part 2. Subfamily Clavatulinae. Ann. Natal Mus. 26(2), 417–470

Endemic fauna of South Africa
vilma
Gastropods described in 1925